George Barber Munroe (January 5, 1922 – August 19, 2014) was an American professional basketball player, Navy veteran, Rhodes scholar, lawyer, and former CEO of Phelps Dodge Corporation.

College
Munroe matriculated at Dartmouth College in the fall of 1939. He played on the Big Green basketball team from 1940–41 to 1942–43, where as junior he was honored as a consensus Second Team All-American. A ,  guard, Munroe guided Dartmouth to the NCAA national title game—the school's first championship appearance—but lost to Stanford, 53–38. They finished the season with a 22–6 overall record, largely led by Munroe, who was the 1941–42 Eastern Intercollegiate Basketball League (Ivy League) scoring champion. In 12 conference games he scored 175 points, good for an average of 14.6 points per game. As a senior in 1942–43, Dartmouth once again reached the NCAA Tournament, but this time lost in the opening round to DePaul, 46–36. They would defeat NYU 51–49 in the East Region consolation game, however, and finish their season with a 20–3 overall record. In the spring of 1943, Munroe graduated from Dartmouth College.

After graduation, Munroe served in the United States Navy from 1943 to 1946.

Professional basketball career
After he was discharged from the Navy, Munroe played for two seasons in the Basketball Association of America (BAA). He spent the 1946–47 season playing for the St. Louis Bombers and the 1947–48 season with the Boston Celtics. In his two professional seasons, Munroe averaged 6.1 points in 80 career games.

Post-playing career

Lawyer and Rhodes Scholar

When his basketball career ended, he enrolled at Harvard Law School where he earned his LL.B. in 1949. Shortly thereafter, Munroe was admitted to the New York State Bar Association and became associated with the firm of Cravath, Swaine & Moore in New York City. He was only with the firm for a short while before enrolling at Christ Church, Oxford, one of the biggest constituent colleges of the University of Oxford in England.

In 1951, Munroe received his B.A. degree and graduated from Christ Church as a Rhodes scholar. Upon returning to the United States he practiced law for several years, but then returned to Oxford and earned an M.A. from Christ Church in 1956. For the next two years, Munroe practiced law in New York, and then in 1958 he joined Phelps Dodge Corporation, an American mining company.

Phelps Dodge Company
In 1962, after spending four years with the company, he was appointed vice president, a position which he held for another four years. Then, in 1966, Munroe took control of the company's daily operations when he was promoted to be its president. After making his way to the very top of the company's ladder by becoming the CEO in 1969, he served as the president and CEO concurrently until 1975, at which point Munroe stepped down as president to focus on his duties as the CEO. He finally retired from the mining company in 1987 but still resumed his seat as a Member of the Board for Phelps Dodge. He was on the Board from 1966 to 1994 and acted as its chairman from 1975 to 1987.

Dartmouth service
Although Munroe graduated from Dartmouth College in 1943, he retained a lifelong dedication to the institution. From 1959 to 1964 he was a Class Agent and was awarded the Hood Trophy in 1964 for his efforts. From 1964 to 1968, Munroe was a member of the Alumni Council and the Class Executive Committee, and in 1977, was elected to the Dartmouth College Board of Trustees. In 1988 he became the Chairman of the Board of Trustees but only served for three years amid a turbulent time in Dartmouth's alumni dissatisfaction. In August 2001, George Munroe donated his papers from his time as the Board Chairman to the Dartmouth College Library for historical archiving purposes.

Personal life
Munroe was born in Joliet, Illinois. He attended Joliet Township High School and graduated from there in 1939. Munroe's father was George Muller Munroe and his mother was Ruth Barber. He had two sons, George Taylor and Ralph W. Taylor, by his first wife Helen Taylor. They were married from June 22, 1945, until getting divorced in 1964. Munroe remarried on May 30, 1968, to Elinor Bunin. He died in August 2014 at the age of 92.

BAA career statistics

Regular season

Playoffs

References

External links

Munroe's full collection of papers during his tenure as Dartmouth's Chairman of the Trustees

1922 births
2014 deaths
All-American college men's basketball players
Alumni of Christ Church, Oxford
American men's basketball players
American Rhodes Scholars
Basketball players from Illinois
Boston Celtics players
Cravath, Swaine & Moore people
Dartmouth Big Green men's basketball players
Guards (basketball)
Harvard Law School alumni
Illinois lawyers
New York (state) lawyers
Phelps Dodge
Sportspeople from Joliet, Illinois
St. Louis Bombers (NBA) players
United States Navy personnel of World War II